Stephen Henderson may refer to:

 Stephen Henderson (literary scholar), (born 1925), African-American scholar of literature and aesthetics
 Stephen Henderson (actor), (born 1949), American actor
 Stephen Henderson (footballer, born 1966), Irish footballer
 Stephen Henderson (journalist), (born 1970), American journalist
 Stephen Henderson (footballer, born 1988), Irish footballer

See also
 Steve Henderson (disambiguation)